Ripon College is a private liberal arts college in Ripon, Wisconsin.  As of 2020, the college enrolled around 800 students, the majority of whom lived on campus. 52% of students were female, and nearly 80% of students were Wisconsin residents.

History

Ripon College was founded in 1851, although its first class of students did not enroll until 1853.  It was first known as Brockway College, named for William S. Brockway, who gave the most, $25, in a fundraising effort.

Ripon's first class, four women, graduated in June 1867. The college was founded with ties to local churches, but early in its history the institution became secular.  In 1868 formal ties with Presbyterian and Congregational churches were cut, but Ripon would retain some ties to its religious past. During the nineteenth century, students were required to attend two church services each Sunday.  The first six presidents of Ripon College had clerical backgrounds, as did the previous president, David Joyce.  Today the school offers classes in world religions, but there are no required religious courses, and students are not required to attend religious services. The college recognized social and academic Greek letter societies in 1924. The Ripon chapter of Phi Beta Kappa was started by Clark Kuebler, who served as president from 1944 to 1955.

The National Forensic League was founded at the college in 1925.  Since that time communication has been important at the college, which today organizes its endeavors as part of a Communication Consortium that provides real-world experience to students, such as managing the campus newspaper, mentoring people within the broader community about communication, and participating in forensics.

Academics

At Ripon College, every student is expected to complete a major. The college is on the semester system and has two optional three-week summer sessions known as Liberal Arts In Focus.  These In Focus programs include both on-campus offerings as well as travel courses to Italy, England, and elsewhere. Students may choose from 31 majors, a variety of pre-professional advising options and also opt to self-design a major. Off-campus study is highly encouraged; nearly one-third of all Ripon College students elect to spend a semester off-campus on a focused area of study. Ripon has a student-to-faculty ratio of 14:1.

Catalyst Curriculum
Students take five Catalyst courses that focus on solving real-world problems. The Catalyst curriculum consists of five seminars, two in the first year, two in the sophomore year, and the applied innovation seminar in the junior year. After completing the Catalyst curriculum, students receive a certificate in Applied Innovation. Ripon College provides a four-year graduation guarantee to all students who remain in good academic standing, declare a major course of study by the end of sophomore year, and follow an approved course plan.

Faculty mentoring

Each incoming student is assigned a faculty mentor based on their area of interest. Together, faculty mentors and staff in the Office of Career Development work with students throughout their time on campus to help set goals and construct a course plan to reach those goals.

Associated Colleges of the Midwest
Ripon is a member of the  Associated Colleges of the Midwest (ACM), a grouping of private liberal arts schools that share expertise and collaborate on off-campus study programs. The college is also affiliated with the Annapolis Group of private liberal arts colleges and is a member of the Council of Independent Colleges.

Center for Politics and the People

The Center for Politics and the People was established in spring 2014. The center sponsors scholarship and hosts special events featuring elected officials and policy makers, high-level campaign operatives, academic experts, journalists, prognosticators and citizens representing a spectrum of political views. The center also manages the college's annual Career Discovery Tour to Washington, D.C., and helps place students in internships.

Center for Career and Professional Development 
The Center for Career and Professional Development offers resources to students such as workshops, employer visits, job fairs, and assistance with writing a resume. It also helps organize the annual Career Discovery Tour.

Summer Opportunity for Advanced Research (SOAR) 
SOAR is a program offered to students of various disciplines to research alongside professors over the summer while living on campus and partaking in volunteer projects around the local community. It was first offered in summer 2021.

Badger Boys State
From 1941 to 2019, the college also served as the host site for Badger Boys State, a summer leadership and citizenship program for more than 800 Wisconsin high school juniors that focuses on exploring the mechanics of American government and politics.

Arts
The college's C.J. Rodman Center for the Arts houses the Departments of Art, Music, and Theater.

Visual art
The Art Department manages two gallery spaces, one of which is dedicated to student work and the other to art more broadly. Work by students and professional artists is also shown across campus. A sculpture garden is located adjacent to the building.  Two art works of note in the permanent collection of the college are life-size portraits by Anthony van Dyck of Princess Amalia of the House of Orange and Sir Roger Townshend. The Classics department also manages a collection of classical Greek and Roman artifacts, many of which are displayed in the campus library.

Music
The college has a music department which offers classes, lessons, and ensembles. Students of any major may participate in the music department and are eligible for music scholarships. The department offers the following ensembles: Orchestra, Symphonic Wind Ensemble, Rally Band, Jazz Ensemble, and three choirs (Chamber Singers, Choral Union, and Concert Choir).  All musical ensembles, with the exception of Chamber Singers, are open to students, faculty and staff, and community members to join without auditioning. All musical performances by campus groups are free to students and the public. The program also hosts visiting musicians each semester, and performances are free to all students.

Theater
The college's theater program produces three productions per year, with students from any major encouraged to act or be involved with set, costume, and makeup design.  Each theater major directs a one-act production their senior year, as part of a campus theater festival.  Students regularly participate in the Region III Kennedy Center American College Theatre Festival.  All theatrical events are free to students and the public.

Sustainability and the environment

Sustainability initiatives
Ripon College attempts to be a sustainable institution. It has a fleet of campus hybrid vehicles, a recycling program, and uses energy efficient light bulbs.

Ceresco Prairie Conservancy
The Ceresco Prairie Conservancy is used by different classes in a number of different disciplines. Trails for walking and snowshoeing throughout this area connect to a municipally run nature park, the South Woods. A student group, EGOR: The Environmental Group of Ripon, focuses on awareness of environmental issues and contributes to the restoration and preservation of the prairie. Students can also major in environmental studies, which is an interdisciplinary program.

Media
 College Days – a monthly newspaper, published both in print and digitally
 WRPN-FM – a campus radio station with digital broadcasts
 RCTV – a television production group (defunct as of Fall 2022)
 Parallax – a literary magazine
 Crimson – yearbook that was formerly distributed every spring. The last issue was published in the spring of 2017.

Student life

Clubs
There are over 60 student clubs on campus, including special interest groups, diversity-based groups, political groups, Greek organizations, and academic honor societies. There is also a Student Senate, a student government that is open to all students to discuss issues and vote on different matters.

Greek life

The college has three sororities, including Alpha Chi Omega, Alpha Delta Pi, and Kappa Delta. The college has four all-male fraternities including chapters of Sigma Chi, Theta Chi, Phi Delta Theta, and a local fraternity, Phi Kappa Pi, (named Merriman for the college's founding president). Students in all four fraternities and all three sororities live in dormitories on campus, following the recent removal of Phi Kappa Pi from Merriman House (demolished in 2021). Phi Kappa Pi was relocated to the Quad living area, with the other three fraternities, after the Merriman house was condemned and the board of Trustees determined that all students (unless exempted) should reside in residence halls. The three sororities live in one dorm, Johnson Hall, which includes independent and first year women.

Diversity
People of color compose 16.9% of the student population. The McNair Scholars program supports first generation college students and African American, Native American, and Hispanic students who wish to attend graduate school. The Center for Diversity and Inclusion (CDI), inaugurated in 2015, is a space on campus that centers diversity, including programming such as multicultural events. Student groups that focus on the experiences of racially diverse, culturally diverse, and LGBT students are also active on campus, and are part of a wider Diversity Coalition through the CDI.

Athletics

Ripon athletics teams participate in NCAA Division III as part of the Midwest Conference. Conference competition for men includes: cross-country, football, soccer (fall), basketball (winter), swimming (winter), indoor and outdoor track, baseball, and tennis (spring). Conference competition for women includes: cross-country, soccer, tennis, volleyball (fall), basketball (winter), swimming (winter), indoor and outdoor track, and softball (spring).

Campus facilities

Education buildings and offices

The Ripon College Historic District is on the National Register of Historic Places.

 Bartlett Hall – part of the Harwood Memorial Union building and houses student services and student organization offices
 East Hall – classrooms and faculty offices 
 Farr Hall – science laboratories, classrooms, and faculty offices
 Harwood Memorial Union – Great Hall, The Spot (student dining option), lounges, mail center, radio station (WRPN), and student organization offices
 Kemper Hall – Information Technology Services
 Lane Library – Ripon College Library and Waitkus Computer Lab
 S.N. Pickard Commons – coffee shop, dining facility, Student Activities and Orientation office, Center for Career and Professional Development, lounges
 Rodman Center for the Performing Arts – theatre, music, and studio art
 Smith Hall – business and financial aid offices, the Office of the President
 Willmore Center – full-sized gymnasium, the tartan area, swimming pool, dance studio, locker rooms 

 Todd Wehr Hall – classrooms and faculty offices
 West Hall – classrooms and faculty offices, houses College Days and Parallax offices

Residence halls

 Campus Apartments – Co-ed, apartment style living for third- and fourth- year students
 Johnson Hall – Independent women and sororities
 The Quad – Independent upper-class students and fraternities
 Anderson Hall – Co-ed; the residence of Phi Kappa Pi
 Bovay Hall – Co-ed
 Brockway Hall – Men only; the residence of Sigma Chi and Theta Chi fraternities
 Mapes Hall – Co-ed; the residence of Phi Delta Theta fraternity
 Scott Hall – First-year men, upper-class men and women
 Tri Dorms (Shaler Hall, Evans Hall, Wright Hall) – Co-ed; first-year women and men

Recognition

For 2023, U.S. News & World Report ranked the school tied at #136 in National Liberal Arts Colleges and tied at #38 in Top Performers on Social Mobility. The school's volunteerism and community service earned it a place on the President's Higher Education Community Service Honor Roll for 2009. In 2009, Forbes ranked Ripon 100th on the list of America's 600 best colleges. The school earned an award from The Chronicle of Higher Education as being one of the "Great Colleges to Work For" in the nation, an award given to institutions that are well-managed and where faculty and staff are enthusiastic about their jobs.

Notable alumni

 Ryan C. Amacher, university administrator
 Frank L. Anders, Medal of Honor recipient
 Jack Ankerson, NFL player
 Dick Bennett, head coach of University of Wisconsin-Green Bay Phoenix, Wisconsin Badgers, and Washington State Cougars men's basketball teams
 Emma H. Blair, class of 1872, editor, translator, historian, and compiler
 Joseph H. Bottum, South Dakota state senator
 Theodore Brameld, philosopher
 Halbert W. Brooks, Wisconsin State Representative
 Fremont C. Chamberlain, Michigan State Representative
 Allen Cohen, composer
 Dennis Conta, politician and consultant
 Bernard Darling, NFL player
 W. R. Davies, second president (1941–1959) of University of Wisconsin–Eau Claire
 Harrison Ford, Academy Award-nominated actor and star of franchise film series such as Indiana Jones, Star Wars, Blade Runner and Jack Ryan
 Justice Michael Gableman, class of 1988, Wisconsin State Supreme Court Justice 2008–present
 George Glennie, NFL player
 Tubby Howard, NFL player
 Bruno E. Jacob, founder of National Forensic League
 Al Jarreau, class of 1962, Grammy Award-winning singer
 Harley Sanford Jones, U.S. Air Force general
 Alan Klapmeier, co-founder of Cirrus Design Corporation and CEO of One Aviation Corporation
 Lewis G. Kellogg, Wisconsin State Senator
 Oscar Hugh La Grange, Union Army general
 Frances Lee McCain, actress
 Mabel Johnson Leland, lecturer, translator
 Charlie Mathys, NFL player for Hammond Pros and Green Bay Packers
 James Megellas, member of 82nd Airborne during World War II
 Elmer A. Morse, U.S. Representative
 Orville W. Mosher, Wisconsin State Senator
 Ingolf E. Rasmus, Wisconsin State Representative
 Joan Raymond, superintendent of the Houston Independent School District
 Dick Rehbein, NFL assistant coach
 Charles Rutkowski, professional football player
 Ted Scalissi, professional football player
 Webb Schultz, MLB player
 Champ Seibold, NFL player for Green Bay Packers and Chicago Cardinals
 Wally Sieb, NFL player
 Dave Smith, professional football player
 Harry G. Snyder, Wisconsin State Representative and Court of Appeals Judge
 Scott Strazzante, photojournalist for the Chicago Tribune and the San Francisco Chronicle
 Richard Threlkeld, correspondent with CBS News and ABC News
 Michael Tinkham, class of 1951, superconductivity physicist
 Spencer Tracy, class of 1924, Academy Award-winning actor
 Samuel R. Webster, Wisconsin State Representative
 Lloyd Wescott, New Jersey agriculturalist and civil servant
 Cowboy Wheeler, NFL player
 Jon Wilcox, State Supreme Court Justice from 1992 to 2007
 Gary G. Yerkey, journalist
 Otto Julius Zobel, inventor of m-derived filter and Zobel network

Notable faculty
 Edward Daniels, geologist
 David Graham, poet
 Karen Holbrook, President of Ohio State University
 Bruno E. Jacob, founder of the National Forensic League
 Wacław Jędrzejewicz, Polish diplomat
 Alfred E. Kahn, Chairman of the Civil Aeronautics Board
 Peg Lautenschlager, Attorney General of Wisconsin
 Minerva Brace Norton, educator and author
 Russell Burton Reynolds, U.S. Army Major General
 Clarissa Tucker Tracy, botanist
 William Hayes Ward, President of the American Oriental Society

References

External links
 

 
Private universities and colleges in Wisconsin
Liberal arts colleges in Wisconsin
Educational institutions established in 1851
Education in Fond du Lac County, Wisconsin
Buildings and structures in Fond du Lac County, Wisconsin
Tourist attractions in Fond du Lac County, Wisconsin
Ripon, Wisconsin
1851 establishments in Wisconsin